Krau Wildlife Reserve is the largest wildlife reserve covering 60,349 ha located in the Titiwangsa Mountains, central state of Pahang, Malaysia that was established during the British Colonial Administration. It is located nearby Benom Mountain in Temerloh District, Pahang and drained by Krau River, Lompat River and Teris River.

It is managed by the Department of Wildlife and National Parks, located south of Lanchang township. In the 1960s, Lord Medway led a zoological expedition to Gunong Benom (2110 m asl) which latter had attracted many scholars, biologists and primatologists to conduct research on the eastern part of the reserve called Kuala Krau.

The lowland dipterocarp forest area contains very high diversity of birds and mammals especially primates and bats. At Kuala Gandah, is the Elephant Centre for the management of displaced animals. At Jenderak is the breeding centre for seladang (Bos gaurus). Among the birdlife, the rare Malayan peacock-pheasant is still found in the reserve in some numbers.

See also 
 List of National Parks of Malaysia
 Malaysian Wildlife Law

Bibliography 
 Krau Wildlife Reserve Management Plan. 2001. Perhilitan and DANCED.
 Marie Cambon, Damian Harper, Eddin Khoo. Lonely Planet : Malaysia, Singapore & Brunei.
 Joshua Eliot, Jane Bickersteth. Footprint Malaysia Handbook.
 Jaclyn H Wolfheim. Primates of the World: Distribution, Abundance and Conservation.
 D S Edwards, W E Booth, S C Choy. Tropical Rainforest Research- Current Issues: Proceedings of the Conference.

Wildlife sanctuaries of Malaysia
Titiwangsa Mountains
Geography of Pahang